Clay Harper is a musician and restaurateur from Atlanta, Georgia. He is known for his work as a songwriter and  frontman in the band the Coolies, and for co-founding the Atlanta-area restaurant chains Fellini's Pizza and La Fonda Latina. He also founded and owns the barbecue chain the Greater Good.

Biography
Harper began his musical career when he co-founded the Coolies in the 1980s. He subsequently founded the band Ottoman Empire in the 1990s. At one point, its members included Daniel Pearl. During the 1990s, he also released two albums (one solo and one with his brother, Mark) on his own label, Casino Music. In 2012, his children's book Are You Sure That Was a Rabbit? was published.

Career as a restaurateur
With Mike Nelson, Harper co-founded Fellini's Pizza in 1982, and also co-founded La Fonda Latina, a restaurant that is frequently located next to Fellini's.  He later founded the frozen yogurt chain Three on the Tree in the summer of 2010. He also founded the barbecue chain The Greater Good, which opened its first location in Tucker, Georgia in 2012.

Discography

Solo
East of Easter (Casino Music, 1997)
Old Airport Road (Terminus, 2013)
Bleak Beauty (Clay Harper, 2016)
Dirt Yard Street (Clay Harper, 2020)
They’ll Never Miss a Five (Clay Harper, 2022)

With Mark Harper
The Slippery Ballerina (Casino Music, 1999)
Not Dogs ... Too Simple (A Tale of Two Kitties) (Casino Music, 2000)

References

Living people
American restaurateurs
American alternative rock musicians
American children's writers
Year of birth missing (living people)